Bay of Fires is an Australian television drama series set to screen on ABC.

Synopsis
The series tells the story of Stella Heikkinen, who suffers professional misfortune and moves her family to a small town in Tasmania.

Cast

 Marta Dusseldorp as Stella Heikkinen
 Kerry Fox
 Toby Leonard Moore
 Yael Stone
 Tony Barry
 Heather Mitchell
 Oscar Redding
 Bob Franklin
 Kim Ko
 Rhys Muldoon
 Imi Mbedla 
 Ava Caryofyllis 
 Ilai Swindells
 Mackenzie Grant
 Mitchem Everett
 Emily Taheny
 Stephen Curry
 Pamela Rabe
 Oscar Redding
 Roz Hammond
 Matt Nable
 Nicholas Bell
 Robert Rabiah as Reg Brown 
 Ben Knight
 Peter Sammak
 Elle Mandalis
 Emily Milledge
 Andre De Vanny

Production
The eight part series is created by Andrew Knight, Marta Dusseldorp and Max Dann and produced by Archipelago Productions and Fremantle. The series is written by Andrew Knight, Max Dann and Sarah Bassiuoni.

References

External links 
 
 https://westcoasttas.com.au/ 

Upcoming drama television series
Television shows set in Tasmania
Australian Broadcasting Corporation original programming
English-language television shows
Television series by Fremantle (company)